Brewer Hill, Brewers' Hill, and Brewer's Hill may refer to:

Brewer's Hill, Baltimore, a neighborhood in Baltimore, Maryland
Brewer Hill, West Virginia, an unincorporated community in Monongalia County
Brewers' Hill, one of the Neighborhoods of Milwaukee